Bezboyaznenny was a  of the Soviet and later Russian navy.

Development and design 

The project began in the late 1960s when it was becoming obvious in the Soviet Navy that naval guns still had an important role particularly in support of amphibious landings, but existing gun cruisers and destroyers were showing their age. A new design was started, employing a new  automatic gun turret.

Construction and career 
Bezboyaznenny was laid down on 28 September 1982 and launched on 27 July 1985 by Zhdanov Shipyard in Leningrad. She was commissioned on 24 February 1987.

In the period from November 25, 1991, to January 7, 1992, the ship carried out an inter-fleet passage from Baltiysk to Vladivostok, without calling at foreign ports. During the passage in the Red Sea, one of the sailors disappeared under unknown circumstances. Another sailor arrested on suspicion of involvement, placed and locked up in a combat post, was found dead in this post three days before arriving in Vladivostok. 

From August 18 to September 16, 1994, she took part in the Pacific Fleet exercises, and hit an air target as part of a ship formation. 

On October 6, 1994, an accident occurred on the ship during preparation for the cruise, as a result of which four sailors were scalded with steam.

On May 9, 1995, during the parade in honor of the 50th anniversary of the victory over Nazi Germany in the Golden Horn Bay, in the sailor's cabin of the BCh-2, the senior sailor Romin, a native of Kamchatka, was beaten to death by the conscripts. (The commander of the ship V.P. Masko for this incident was removed from office.) In August, the destroyer took part in the parade in honor of the 50th anniversary of the end of the war in the Golden Horn Bay. On October 20, the ship received the prize of the Commander-in-Chief of the Navy for the performance of rocket firing as part of the KUG with the destroyer . 

At the end of 1997, the destroyer was recognized as the best in the Pacific Fleet in terms of fire training. 

In 1999, the ship was taken to the reserve for repairs but remained there until 2018. 

It was sent for recycling in October 2020.

References 

1989 ships
Ships built at Severnaya Verf
Cold War destroyers of the Soviet Union
Sovremenny-class destroyers